Siv Bråten Lunde (born 31 December 1960) is a former Norwegian biathlete who received five medals in the world championships during her career. She is now a teacher at Trysil Ungdomsskole. She has also helped Nikolai Hansen Bakken.

World championships
She participated in the Norwegian team that won silver and bronze medals in the 3 × 5 km relay in 1984, 1985, 1986 and 1987. She won a silver medal in the 10 km individual at the 1986 Biathlon World Championships 1986 in Falun.

World cup
Siv Bråten Lunde finished second in the overall Biathlon World Cup in the 1982/83 season.

National championships
She was Norwegian champion six times.

Personal life
She married Ola Lunde on 5 July 1986.

References

1960 births
Living people
Norwegian female biathletes
Biathlon World Championships medalists
20th-century Norwegian women